Lagunen Storsenter is a shopping center located in the borough Fana in Bergen, Norway. It is one of the largest shopping centres in Norway and in 2002, it was the fifth largest shopping facility in Scandinavia, with a turnover of 2,540 billion Norwegian kroner. 
The shopping centre was designed by architect Jan Olav Reither (1929–2003) and opened in 1985. Lagunen Storsenter is owned by Nordås Industrier AS and managed by the Olav Thon Group.

See also
Bergen Storsenter

References

External links
Official website

Buildings and structures in Bergen
Shopping centres in Norway
1985 establishments in Norway
Tourist attractions in Bergen
Shopping malls established in 1985